Agathiceras is a subglobose goniatitid from the family Agathiceratidae, widespread and locally abundant in Lower Pennsylvanian to Middle Permian sediments, e.g. the Urals, Sicily, and Texas.

Agathiceras, named by Gemmellaro in 1887 from the Middle Permian Sicilian species, A. suessi, has a broadly rounded outer edge, known as the venter, being at the lower side of the animal during life, and a deeply impressed innerside, the dorsum which corresponds with the back or dorsal side of the animal.  The sutures are goniatitic with three lateral and one dorsolateral lobes on either side.  Those that are external are spatulate, those hidden are V-shaped.  The siphuncle is primitive with the septal necks pointing to the rear, a condition known as retrosiphonate.

Agathiceras is thought to be derived from Proshumardites according to Saunders et al. (1999), which is thought to be derived from Dombarites; all of which are included in the Agathiceratidae. Dombarites is presumed to have its origin in Goniatites, type genus of the Goniatitidae

Species
 Agathiceras anceps
 Agathiceras applanatum
 Agathiceras applini
 Agathiceras ciscoense
 Agathiceras contractum
 Agathiceras divisum
 Agathiceras frechi
 Agathiceras girtyi
 Agathiceras jilinense
 Agathiceras mediterraneum
 Agathiceras sequaxilirae
 Agathiceras suessi
 Agathiceras sundaicum
 Agathiceras tornatum
 Agathiceras uralicum
 Agathiceras verkhoyanicum
 Agathiceras vulgatum

References
 Miller, Furnish, and Schindewolf (1960) ; Paleozoic Ammonoidea, in the Treatise on Invertebrate Paleontology, Part L, Ammonoidea; Geological Soc. of America and Univ of Kansas.
  Saunders et al. 1999, Evolution of Complexity in Paleozoic Ammonoid Sutures,  Supplementary Material; Science, 
 

Specific

Agathiceratidae
Goniatitida genera
Fossil taxa described in 1887
Ammonites of North America
Pennsylvanian first appearances
Guadalupian genus extinctions
Paleozoic life of British Columbia
Paleozoic life of Nunavut